This is a list of mayors of Omaha, Nebraska, United States.

List of mayors

See also
 Government of Omaha
 History of Omaha

References

Omaha

Mayors